Amy Sarkisian (born 1969 in Cleveland, Ohio, U.S.) is a contemporary artist living and working in Los Angeles, California. She received a BFA from Kent State University in 1994 and a MFA from UCLA in 1997.

Sarkisian is primarily a sculptor but works in a variety of media that includes painting, drawing and collage. She is known for her jeweled skulls. In a 2011 interview, she named Brancusi, Eva Hesse and Louise Bourgeois as among her influences.

References

External links

 Amy Sarkisian

Living people
1969 births
Artists from Cleveland
Kent State University alumni
American women sculptors
American people of Armenian descent
American contemporary artists
Postmodern artists
Art in Greater Los Angeles
Sculptors from Ohio
21st-century American women artists